Edward C. Gainey (born February 19, 1970) is an American politician who is the 61st mayor of Pittsburgh, Pennsylvania. Previously, he served as a member of the Pennsylvania House of Representatives from the 24th district. In November 2021, Gainey became the first African-American to be elected mayor of Pittsburgh, and assumed office on January 3, 2022.

Early life and education
Gainey was born and raised in Pittsburgh by a single teenage mom with the help of her mother. When he was very young, the family moved from the Hill District neighborhood to Lawn Street in the South Oakland neighborhood, where they were the second black family to live on the street. When he was seven the family moved to the East Liberty neighborhood. There he attended Peabody High School, where he played basketball, graduating in 1988. In 1994, he graduated with his Bachelor's degree in business management from Morgan State University.

Career
Early on in his career, Gainey spent six years as a legislative aide to Pennsylvania State Representative Joseph Preston Jr. Gainey's early career also included a period as a special projects manager under Pittsburgh Mayor Tom Murphy. During this period, Gainey worked to promote economic development in East Liberty. Gainey and Preston's relationship later soured, and Gainey first posed a primary challenge to Preston in 2004. In 2006, Gainey challenged Preston for the second time, losing by 94 votes.

Gainey later took a position with the City of Pittsburgh under Mayor Luke Ravenstahl in a community development role. In 2010, he became chairman of the city's Democratic Party committee.

Pennsylvania House of Representatives
In 2012, on his third attempt, Gainey defeated his former boss, Joseph Preston Jr., in a Democratic primary. Gainey represented the 24th District from 2013 to 2022. His district included many majority-Black neighborhoods in Pittsburgh, including Homewood, East Liberty, East Hills, and Lincoln-Lemington, plus the demographically similar adjacent municipality of Wilkinsburg. Gainey was a member of the Pennsylvania Legislative Black Caucus.

In 2014, while serving in the Pennsylvania state legislature, Gainey joined the board of directors of the Urban Redevelopment Authority of Pittsburgh (URA), Pittsburgh's economic development agency, eventually becoming vice chair.

Mayor of Pittsburgh

In January 2021, Gainey announced his candidacy for the Democratic nomination in the 2021 Pittsburgh mayoral election. Gainey's opponents included incumbent mayor Bill Peduto, who was running for re-election after two terms in office.

While Peduto won high-profile endorsements from institutional players, including eight out of nine members of Pittsburgh's City Council, as well as Allegheny County Executive Rich Fitzgerald and U.S. Representative Mike Doyle, Peduto and Gainey split endorsements from organized labor groups, and Gainey won the endorsement of the Allegheny County Democratic Committee and the Pittsburgh Post-Gazette. Gainey attacked Peduto's performance over his two terms as mayor, accusing the incumbent mayor of failing to pursue tax payments from nonprofit healthcare giant UPMC and of squandering an opportunity to improve police–community relations after the shooting of Antwon Rose.

In May 2021, Gainey ousted Peduto in the Democratic Primary 46% to 39%, becoming the Democratic candidate for mayor of Pittsburgh in November's general election. On November 2, 2021 Gainey defeated Republican nominee Tony Moreno with over 70% of the vote, becoming the mayor-elect of Pittsburgh Gainey assumed office as the 61st mayor of Pittsburgh on January 3, 2022.

Personal life
On January 22, 2016, Gainey's younger sister, Janese Talton-Jackson, was shot dead in Pittsburgh's Homewood neighborhood by a man who followed her out of a bar.

Electoral history

References

External links
Office of Mayor Ed Gainey
 
Legislative page
Twitter account

1970 births
20th-century African-American people
21st-century African-American politicians
21st-century American politicians
African-American state legislators in Pennsylvania
Living people
Mayors of Pittsburgh
Democratic Party members of the Pennsylvania House of Representatives
Morgan State University alumni
Politicians from Pittsburgh
African-American people in Pennsylvania politics
African-American mayors in Pennsylvania